The Albert Pike Memorial Temple is a historic Masonic lodge at 700-724 Scott Street in Little Rock, Arkansas.  It is an imposing three-story Classical Revival structure, finished in limestone, and featuring a long colonnade of  Ionic columns on its front facade, which occupies half of a city block.  Entry is gained to the building via three sets of massive bronze doors flanked by stone eagles.  Completed in 1924, it was designed by local Masons George R. Mann and Eugene Stern.  It is named in honor of Albert Pike.

The building was listed on the National Register of Historic Places in 1986.

See also
National Register of Historic Places listings in Little Rock, Arkansas

References

External links
Little Rock Scottish Rite Masonic Lodge

Neoclassical architecture in Arkansas
Buildings and structures completed in 1924
Buildings and structures in Little Rock, Arkansas
National Register of Historic Places in Little Rock, Arkansas
1924 establishments in Arkansas